The locomotives of Palatine Class T 4I were saturated steam tank engines operated by the Palatinate Railway. Krauss delivered four of them in 1895 and a further three in 1897. The development of these engines had been based on the second batch of Bavarian D VIII engines and they differed only in a few dimensions: for example, the diameter of the carrying and coupled wheels was smaller. In addition they had a larger coal tank. 

In 1908 and 1910 Krauss supplied two batches of four locomotives, which were now designated the Palatine D VIII. 
These differed in having a larger fuel tank and a higher maximum boiler pressure: 13 as opposed to 12 bar. 

In 1925 the Deutsche Reichsbahn took over all 15 locomotives and grouped them together with the Bavarian D VIII into DRG Class 98.6. The first seven machines were allocated numbers 98 651–657 and the eight newer ones numbers 98 681–688. The first group was retired by 1940, the second survived to join the Deutsche Bundesbahn fleet. Nos. 98 682 and 98 686 were the last two units to be retired, in 1950.

In 1949 the Augsburger Localbahn bought no. 98 683 and operated it as "no. 10" until 1957.

See also 
 Palatinate Railway
 List of Palatine locomotives and railbuses

References

0-6-2T locomotives
T 04 1
Railway locomotives introduced in 1895
Krauss locomotives
Standard gauge locomotives of Germany
C1′ n2t locomotives
Freight locomotives